Michelle Tracy Sammons (born 11 September 1987) is a South African former professional tennis player.

She has career-high WTA rankings of 666 in singles and 268 in doubles, both achieved in 2015. In her career, Sammons won one  singles title and six doubles titles on the ITF Women's Circuit.

Playing for South Africa in Fed Cup, she has a win–loss record of 1–4.

Sammons made her WTA Tour main-draw debut at the 2015 Internationaux de Strasbourg, partnering Carolin Daniels in the doubles competition.

ITF finals

Singles (1–0)

Doubles (6–2)

External links
 
 
 
 Purdue University profile

1987 births
Living people
South African female tennis players
Sportspeople from Durban
People from Kempton Park, Gauteng
Purdue Boilermakers women's tennis players
White South African people
Sportspeople from Gauteng